The Old English Game is a British breed of domestic chicken. It was probably originally bred for cockfighting. Two different standards are recognised by the Poultry Club of Great Britain: Carlisle Old English Game and Oxford Old English Game. There is also an Old English Game bantam.

Characteristics 

The Old English Game has many colour variants. Twenty-eight are recognised by the American Poultry Association, while the Entente Européenne d’Aviculture et de Cuniculture lists thirty-three. In Britain, thirteen colours are recognised for the Carlisle type, and thirty for the Oxford type.

Use 

Since the abolition of cock-fighting in 1849, the Old English Game has been kept primarily for show. Old English Game hens may lay about forty small tinted eggs in a year.

References

Chicken breeds
Chicken breeds originating in the United Kingdom
Animal breeds on the RBST Watchlist